The Nordhausen-Wernigerode Railway Company incorporated twelve Mallet locomotives into its fleet as Numbers 11 to 22. In 1950 the remaining locomotives were renumbered as Class 99.590 by the Deutsche Reichsbahn.

History 

In 1897, shortly after the railway company's foundation, the first of a new batch of locomotives was built for the NWE by Arnold Jung in Jungenthal. It was a Mallet engine, numbered NWE 11, with the front two axles in an inside frame and the rear two axles in an outside frame. The fleet quickly grew to 12 locos of which nine were made by Jung from 1897 to 1901 and three by the Mecklenburgische Maschinen- und Waggonbau AG in Güstrow in 1897
. The locomotives were very reliable, but six had to be handed over to the military railways during the World War I (including all three engines built in Güstrow) for use in France, and they never returned from their wartime duties. The remaining six engines received new, larger boilers with a higher performance. In 1927, locomotive NWE 12II suffered a derailment in Thumkuhlenthal upon which it fell off the high embankment. The engine, one passenger coach and the luggage van were so badly damaged that they had to be dismantled on the spot.

In the mid-1950s, the first three newly designed locomotives (Neubauloks) of DR Class 99.23–24 came to the Harz Railway. As a result, the remaining five Mallets were no longer needed on the Nordhausen–Wernigerode line and were transferred to the Selke Valley Railway which suffered from a shortage of motive power. Two were scrapped - 99 5905 in 1975 due to damaged cylinders and an expired boiler certificate and 99 5904 in 1990 reportedly due to a damaged axle - but the remaining three are still in the fleet. 99 5901 suffered an accident in 1977, but could be repaired. After all passenger trains on the Harz narrow gauge lines were fitted with compressed air brakes, the HSB mallets could not be used for passenger duties any more and were stabled. Therefore, while 99 5901 passed inspection in 1991, it could only be used as a helper engine when the Brocken line was reopened. Only in 1992, suitable compressed air braking equipment was found for two engines. 99 5903 was converted first, followed by 99 5901 in 1993. These engines were repainted in their historic green livery with yellow ornamentation.

In addition, they were given their old numbers again: NWE 11 and NWE 13II. 99 5901 was repainted in black in 1998, and received a new, more powerful boiler in 2002. No. 99 5902 was converted to compressed air brakes in 2000. It has now the number NWE 12III and runs in green livery. After its operational certificates expired, maintenance on no. 99 5903 has been deferred.

Harz Narrow Gauge Railways currently operate the following engines of this type:
 99 5901: operational,
 99 5902: operational, used for specials,
 99 5903: certificates expired, stabled in Wernigerode Westentor station.

A similar locomotive is no. 99 5906, but with the rear axles mounted in an inside frame.

References

Literature

External links 
 Data sheet 5901 of the Freundeskreis Selketalbahn

Mallet locomotives
Narrow gauge steam locomotives of Germany
Metre gauge steam locomotives
B′B n4vt locomotives
0-4-4-0T locomotives
Private locomotives of Germany
Arnold Jung locomotives